Robert Allen Cooley (27 June 1873 – 16 November 1968) was a US entomologist. Born in Deerfield, Massachusetts, he studied at Massachusetts Agricultural College and worked at Montana State College. He was appointed the first state entomologist for Montana in 1903, and worked on Rocky Mountain spotted fever, studying the life cycle of the tick that transmits the Rickettsia bacteria that cause the disease. He also worked on the eradication of the disease and from 1931 until his retirement in 1946 was head entomologist at the Rocky Mountain Laboratory, Hamilton, Montana, where the vaccine was developed. Cooley died at the age of 95 in Hamilton. The Cooley Laboratory at Montana State University is named in his honour.

Sources and further reading
Kohls, G.M.; Robert Allen Cooley, 1873-1968, J Econ Entomol. 1969 Aug; 62(4): 972. 
'Cooley, Robert Allen' (p. 270) in Volume 54 of The National Cyclopaedia of American Biography (1973)
Jannotta, Sepp; Robert Cooley, The Montana State University Magazine: Mountains and Minds, 12 October 2012
Robert Cooley, 125 Montana Newsmakers (Great Falls Tribune)
Robert A. Cooley Residence in 'Bon Ton Historical District' (Montana History Wiki)
Symposium to celebrate MSU's Cooley Lab renovation (Montana State University)
Address Delivered on the Occasion of the Unveiling of the Gittinger-Kerlee Memorial (1929, Robert A. Cooley)

1873 births
1968 deaths
American entomologists
American parasitologists
Massachusetts Agricultural College alumni